This is a list of schools in Fangshan District, Beijing.

Secondary schools
Note: In China the word 中学 zhōngxué, literally translated as "middle school", refers to any secondary school and differs from the American usage of the term "middle school" to mean specifically a lower secondary school or junior high school. 初中 chū​zhōng is used to refer to a lower secondary school.

 Beijing No. 4 High School Fangshan Branch School (北京四中房山分校)
  Langyue School (朗悦学校)
 Beijing City Yanshan Qianjin High School (北京市燕山前进中学)
 Beijing City Yanshan Xiangyang High School (北京市燕山向阳中学) 
 Beijing City Yanshan Xingcheng High School (北京市燕山星城中学)
 Beijing City Fangshan No. 4 High School (北京市房山第四中学)
 Beijing City Fangshan District 401 School (北京市房山区四〇一学校)
 Beijing City Fangshan District Beiluyuan School (北京市房山区北潞园学校)
 Beijing City Fangshan District Daning School (北京市房山区大宁学校)
 Beijing City Fangshan District Haotian School (北京市房山区昊天学校)
 Beijing City Fangshan District Beiluo High School (北京市房山区北洛中学)
 Beijing City Fangshan District Changyang High School (北京市房山区长阳中学)
 Beijing City Fangshan District Chenxi High School (北京市房山区晨曦中学)
 Beijing City Fangshan District Doudian High School (北京市房山区窦店中学)
 Beijing City Fangshan District Experimental High School (北京市房山区实验中学)
 Beijing City Fangshan District Fangshan High School (北京市房山区房山中学)
 Beijing City Fangshan District Fangshan No. 2 High School (北京市房山区房山第二中学)
 Beijing City Fangshan District Fangshan No. 3 High School (北京市房山区房山第三中学)
 Beijing City Fangshan District Fangshan No. 5 High School (北京市房山区房山第五中学)
 Beijing City Fangshan District Hancunhe High School (北京市房山区韩村河中学)
 Beijing City Fangshan District Hulufa High School (北京市房山区葫芦垡中学)
 Beijing City Fangshan District Jiaodao High School (北京市房山区交道中学)
 Beijing City Fangshan District Liangxiang High School (北京市房山区良乡中学)
 Beijing City Fangshan District Liangxiang No. 2 High School (北京市房山区良乡第二中学)
 Beijing City Fangshan District Liangxiang No. 3 High School (北京市房山区良乡第三中学)
 Beijing City Fangshan District Liangxiang No. 4 High School (北京市房山区良乡第四中学)
 Beijing City Fangshan District Liangxiang No. 5 High School (北京市房山区良乡第五中学)
 Beijing City Fangshan District Liangxiang No. 6 High School (北京市房山区良乡第六中学)
 Beijing City Fangshan District Liulihe High School (北京市房山区琉璃河中学)
 Beijing City Fangshan District Nanliyuan High School (北京市房山区南梨园中学)
 Beijing City Fangshan District Nanshangle High School (北京市房山区南尚乐中学)
 Beijing City Fangshan District Nanzhao High School (北京市房山区南召中学)
 Beijing City Fangshan District Qinglonghu High School (北京市房山区青龙湖中学)
 Beijing City Fangshan District Shilou High School (北京市房山区石楼中学)
 Beijing City Fangshan District Shiwo High School (北京市房山区石窝中学)
 Beijing City Fangshan District Tuoli High School (北京市房山区坨里中学) Beijing Institute of Education Fangshan Experimental School (北京教育学院房山实验学校) - Junior High School Division (初中部) and Senior High School Division (高中部)
 Beijing City Fangshan District Xiacun High School (北京市房山区夏村中学)
 Beijing City Fangshan District Yuegezhuang High School  (北京市房山区岳各庄中学)
 Beijing City Fangshan District Zhangfang High School (北京市房山区张坊中学)
 Beijing City Fangshan District Zhanggou High School (北京市房山区长沟中学)
 Beijing City Fangshan District Zhoukoudian High School (北京市房山区周口店中学)
 Beijing Normal University Liangxiang Affiliated High School (北京师范大学良乡附属中学)
 Beijing Normal University Yanhua Affiliated High School (北京师范大学燕化附属中学)
 Capital Normal University Affiliated Fangshan High School (首都师范大学附属房山中学)

Primary schools

 Beijing City Fangshan District Beiluyuan School (北京市房山区北潞园学校)
 Beijing City Fangshan District Haotian School (北京市房山区昊天学校)

References

Fangshan
Schools